The Shooters was a five-piece country music band founded in Muscle Shoals, Alabama. It consisted of Walt Aldridge (lead vocals, guitar), Gary Baker (bass guitar), Barry Billings (guitar), Chalmers Davis (keyboards), and Michael Dillon ([drums). They charted several times on the Billboard country charts between 1986 and 1989. The quintet's first four singles were to have been included on an album titled Going Against the Wind. 1989's Solid as a Rock included their highest-charting single, the number 13 "Borderline".

After disbanding, Aldridge worked as a songwriter and record producer, while Baker joined songwriting partner Frank J. Myers to write John Michael Montgomery's 1994 hit single "I Swear", which was later covered by All-4-One as well. Baker and Myers also recorded one album as the duo Baker & Myers.

Discography

Albums

Singles

Music videos

References

Country music groups from Alabama
Epic Records artists
Musical groups from Alabama
Musical groups established in 1987
Musical groups disestablished in 1990